Autonomy South (AS), whose complete name is Autonomy South – We for the South, is a regionalist  political party in Italy based in the Southern Italy.

History
The party was born in October 2012 by a split of We the South, after a court sentence that banned to the faction of Iannaccone, Belcastro and Porfidia to still use the name "We the South".

In 2013 Autonomy South signed a federative pact with Reality Italy, a southern party which usually sides with the centre-left Democratic Party.

References

External links

Catholic political parties

Christian democratic parties in Italy
Regionalist parties in Italy
Political parties established in 2012
2012 establishments in Italy